This is a list of known Roman governors of Sicilia, the Roman province of Sicily.

Republican governors of Sicily 
(The following list is based on Jonathan R. W. Prag, "Roman Magistrates in Sicily, 227-49 BC.", in La Sicile de Cicéron: lecture des Verrines. Actes du colloque de Paris (19-20 mai 2006) (Besançon: Institut des Sciences et Techniques de l'Antiquité, 2007), pp. 287–310.)

(Note: Prag omits the names of any magistrate in Sicily between the creation of the province in 241 BC and 227 BC because "no evidence exists.")

 Gaius Flaminius c. 227 BC
 Marcus Valerius Laevinus c. 227 BC
 M. Aemilius (Lepidus) 218 BC
 Titus Otacilius Crassus 217 BC
 Marcus Claudius Marcellus praetor 216 BC
 Appius Claudius Pulcher praetor 215
 Publius Cornelius Lentulus praetor 214
 C. Sulpicius praetor 211 BC
 Marcus Cornelius Cethegus praetor 211 BC
 Lucius Cincius Alimentus praetor 210 BC
 Sextus Julius Caesar praetor 208 BC
 C. Mamilius (Atellus) praetor 207 BC
 C. Servilius (Geminus) praetor 206 BC
 Lucius Aemilius Papus praetor 205 BC
 Marcus Pomponius Matho praetor 204 BC
 Publius Villius Tappulus praetor 203 BC
 Gnaeus Tremelius Flaccus praetor 202 BC
 Publius Aelius Tubero praetor 201 BC
 Quintus Fulvius Gillo praetor 200 BC
 Lucius Valerius Flaccus praetor 199 BC
 M. Claudius Marcellus praetor 198 BC
 Lucius Manlius Vulso praetor 197 BC
 Gaius Laelius praetor 196 BC
 Gnaeus Manlius Vulso praetor 195 BC
 Gnaeus Cornelius Blasio praetor 194 BC
 Lucius Cornelius Scipio Asiaticus praetor 193 BC
 Lucius Valerius Tappo praetor 192 BC
 Marcus Aemilius Lepidus praetor 191 BC
 Gaius Atinius Labeo praetor 190 BC
 Marcus Sempronius Tuditanus praetor 189 BC
 Quintus Marcius Philippus praetor 188 BC
 L. Terentius Massaliota praetor 187 BC
 Publius Cornelius Sulla praetor 186 BC
 [5 possible men] praetor 185 BC
 Gaius Sempronius Blaesus praetor 184 BC
 Sp. Postumius Albinus (Paullulus) praetor 183 BC
 Lucius Caecilius Denter praetor 182 BC
 Tiberius Claudius Nero praetor 181 BC
 Publius Cornelius Mammula praetor 180 BC
 Quintus Mucius Scaevola praetor 179 BC
 (?) C. Cluvius Saxula praetor (?) 178 BC
 C. Numisius praetor 177 BC
 Lucius Aquilius Gallus praetor 176 BC 
 L. Claudius praetor 174 BC
 M. Furius Crassipes praetor 173 BC
 C. Memmius praetor 172 BC
 Gaius Caninius Rebilus praetor 171 BC
 Servius Cornelius Lentulus praetor 169 BC
 Marcus Aebutius Helva praetor 168 BC
 Tiberius Claudius Nero praetor 167 BC
 (?) P. Quinctilius Varus praetor 166 BC
 Quintus Fabius Maximus Aemilianus praetor 149 BC
 Publius Cornelius Scipio Aemilianus Africanus procos. 146 BC
 (L.?) Cornelius Lentulus praetor 136 BC
 Lucius Plautius Hypsaeus praetor 135 BC (?)
 Manlius praetor 134 BC (?)
 M. Perperna praetor 133 BC
 L. Calpurnius Piso Frugi 
 T. Annius Rufus praetor 131 BC
 T. Quinctius Flamininus praetor 126 BC
 Marcus Papirius Carbo praetor 114 BC (?)
 Quintus Caecilius Metellus Numidicus praetor 112 BC (?)
 L. Hortensius praetor 111 BC (?)
 Publius Licinius Nerva praetor 104 BC
 L. Licinius Lucullus propraetor 103 BC
 C. Servilius praetor 102 BC
 Lucius Domitius Ahenobarbus praetor 97 BC
 Gaius Claudius Pulcher praetor 95 BC
 L. (Sempronius) Asellio praetor between 96 & 92 BC
 C. Norbanus (Balbus or "Pulbus") praetor 90 BC (?)
 M. Perperna praetor 82 BC
 Marcus Aemilius Lepidus propraetor 80 BC
 Lucius Cornelius Sisenna propraetor 77 BC (?)
 Sex. Peducaeus propraetor 76, 75 BC
 C. Licinius Sacerdos praetor 75 BC
 Publius Cornelius Lentulus Sura proconsul 74 BC
 Gaius Verres propraetor 73—71 BC
 Quintus Arrius propraetor 71 BC
 Lucius Caecilius Metellus propraetor 70 BC
 C. Vergilius Balbus propraetor 61-58 BC
 L. Caecilius Rufus propraetor 56 BC (?)
 Marcus Porcius Cato propraetor 49 BC

Imperial governors of Sicily 
 L. Sestius Quirinus — reign of Augustus
 L. Mussidius (Longus?) — reign of Augustus
 (Cornelius) Sisenna — reign of Augustus
 Quintus Terentius Culleo — reign of Augustus
 Quintus Junius Blaesus — ante AD 10
 L. Clodius Rufus — between 2 BC and AD 14
 L. Seius — reign of Augustus
 P. F[lavius] Silvanus — reign of Tiberius
 Alfidius Sabinus 
 Publius Plautius Pulcher — between 13 BC and AD 14 
 Aulus Didius Gallus — between AD 21 and 38
 M. Haterius Candidus
 Cascellius
 C. Asinius Tucurianus — between AD 50 and 100
 Titus Junius Montanus ante 81
 ? Terentius Priscus — reign of Domitian
 Senecio Memmius Afer — 97/98
 Marcus Pompeius Macrinus Neos Theophanes — 113/114
 Lucius Burbuleius Optatus Ligarianus — 130/131
 Publius Cluvius Maximus Paullinus — 133/134
 Junius Julianus — reign of Trajan or Hadrian ?
 Quintus Caecilius Marcellus — reign of Hadrian
 Gaius Curtius Justus — ?146/147
 Publius Septimius Geta — ?187/188
 Lucius Septimius Severus — 189/190
 Q. Pompeius Balbus
 C. Bultius Geminius Titianus — end 2nd century/beginning 3rd century
 C. Fulvius Maximus (might be proconsul or proconsular legate) — reign of Elagabalus or Severus Alexander
 Quintus Lusius Laberius — reign of Commodus?
 Marcus Marius Titius Rufinus — ante 235
 Marcus Domitius Valerianus — ?233/234
 Quintianus — AD 251
 M. Veturius Veturianus
 Gaius Mevius Donatus Junianus
 Q. Aquillius Niger — 3rd century
 Q. Annius Annianus Postumianus

References 

 
Ancient Sicily
Sicilia